Kitty Jean Bilbrew (July 7, 1923 – August 11, 2009), better known as Kitty White, was an American jazz singer who was popular in Los Angeles nightclubs.

She recorded mostly on the West Coast with Buddy Collette, Gerald Wiggins, Chico Hamilton, Bud Shank and Red Callender. She sang many demo recordings for her friend, Los Angeles blues composer Jessie Mae Robinson, including "I Went to Your Wedding", a No. 1 hit for Patti Page in 1953. She was also the sole female voice on Elvis Presley's "Crawfish" from the "King Creole" film soundtrack.

Biography
Kitty Jean Bilbrew was born on July 7, 1923 in Los Angeles, California. She had a twin sister, Maudie, and was raised in a musical family: her parents A. C. Bilbrew and Ralph Bilbrew were singers, and her uncle was a well-known vaudevillian and disc jockey. She started her career at the age of sixteen as a singer and a pianist. She appeared in local night clubs in her home town Los Angeles like the Hob Nob, the Club Gala, the Haig and The Captain's Table. When Kitty branched out and opened at the Black Orchid in Chicago, Illinois, she was introduced to the executives of Mercury Records, and she became a Mercury recording artist.

Her twin sister, Maudie Jeanette, also sang and briefly worked with Duke Ellington's revue, Jump for Joy, but never pursued an active career. Their mother, known as A.C. Bilbrew, organized an all-black chorus that performed in the 1929 film Hearts of Dixie.

A.C. later recorded the 1955 protest song "The Ballad of Emmett Till" for Dootone Records. Kitty picked up her catchy jazz name legitimately by marrying songwriter Eddie White in the 1940s.  She moved to Palm Springs, California in 1967 and sang at the Spa Hotel for sixteen years.

White died in Palm Springs, at the age of 86, after suffering a stroke.

Discography

Kitty White albums
 1955 A New Voice in Jazz (EmArcy)
 1956 Kitty White (EmArcy) (with Corky Hale, harp)
 1956 A Moment of Love (Pacific) (with Corky Hale, harp)
 1956 Cold Fire! (EmArcy)
 1957 Folk Songs/And Now For Your Musical Enjoyment (Mercury)
 1959 Sweet Talk (Roulette)
 1962 Newborn (Horizon) (with Laurindo Almeida, Buddy Collette and Red Mitchell)
 1966 Kitty White (Clover)

Compilations
 2007 A New Voice in Jazz (Fresh Sound Records) (CD reissue of 1st album, plus the album Sweet Talk)
 2008 Cold Fire! & Folk Songs (Fresh Sound Records)

With others
 1958 King Creole, Elvis Presley soundtrack album (RCA Victor). White sings a duet on "Crawfish"

References

External links

1923 births
2009 deaths
American jazz singers
EmArcy Records artists
Musicians from Palm Springs, California
20th-century American women singers
20th-century American singers
Jazz musicians from California